Richard N. Dixon ( - June 7, 2012) was the first African American Treasurer of Maryland. Previously, he was a member of the Maryland House of Delegates, representing Carroll County, Maryland, from 1983 to 1996.

Background
Richard Dixon was one of six children of Thomas and Mamie Dixon. His father earned a living as a custodian but insisted that his children go to college.

Education
Dixon attended the Robert Moton School, in Westminster, Maryland, the only school in the county which black children could attend. He then attended college at Morgan State College in Baltimore, Maryland, earning a Bachelor of Science degree.  After Morgan, he enlisted in the U.S. Army, entering as a private and leaving with the rank of captain. Dixon then returned to Morgan and earned his M.B.A.

References 

State treasurers of Maryland
Democratic Party members of the Maryland House of Delegates
1938 births
People from Westminster, Maryland
2012 deaths
Morgan State University alumni